Denmark Bay is an Arctic waterway in Kitikmeot Region, Nunavut, Canada. It is located in western M'Clintock Channel, off the eastern coast of Victoria Island. It is separated from Homan Bay by a peninsula with a narrow isthmus.

Geography
There are several islands within the bay, including Falsen Island at its headwaters.

Moraine ridges are found along eastern Victoria Island from Denmark Bay to Greely Haven.

History
The Ekalluktogmiut, a subgroup of Copper Inuit, were traditionally located from Denmark Bay through Dease Strait. However, Copper Inuit traditional hunting area was south of the Denmark Bay/Walker Bay region.

References

Bays of Kitikmeot Region
Victoria Island (Canada)
Former populated places in the Kitikmeot Region